Frank Leslie Stillwell OBE, (27 June 1888 – 8 February 1963) was an Australian geologist, winner of the David Syme Research Prize awarded by the University of Melbourne in 1919 and the Clarke Medal awarded by the Royal Society of New South Wales in 1951.

Stillwell was educated at the University of Melbourne and joined the Australasian Antarctic Expedition (1911–1914) as geologist. He spent 17 months in Antarctica under Douglas Mawson. He was stationed at the Main Base at Commonwealth Bay.

Stillwell then worked at Broken Hill, New South Wales 1919–1921, as assistant geologist under  Dr. Ernest C. Andrews. He mapped the Kalgoorlie, Western Australia goldfield 1927–1928.

Stillwell joined the Royal Society of Victoria in 1910 and served as President from 1953 to 1954.

He also discovered and named the rare-earth boro-silicate mineral Stillwellite-(Ce).

References
 Frank Leslie Stillwell 1888–1963 Australian Academy of Science
 Arthur A. Wilcock, 'Stillwell, Frank Leslie (1888–1963)', Australian Dictionary of Biography, Volume 12, MUP, 1990, pp. 94–95.

1888 births
1963 deaths
Australasian Antarctic Expedition
20th-century Australian geologists
Fellows of the Australian Academy of Science
Geologists from Melbourne
Members of the Order of the British Empire